St Pauls (also written St Paul's) is an inner suburb of Bristol, England, situated just northeast of the city centre and west of the M32. It is bounded by the A38 (Stokes Croft), the B4051 (Ashley Road), the A4032 (Newfoundland Way) and the A4044 (Newfoundland Street), although the River Frome was traditionally the eastern boundary before A4032 was constructed. St Pauls was laid out in the early 18th century as one of Bristol's first suburbs.

History

In the 1870s the Brooks Dye Works opened on the edge of St Paul's and became a major local employer, leading to the construction of terraced houses. Together with migration to Bristol, both from overseas and within Britain, this led to St Pauls becoming a densely populated suburb by the Victorian era.

The area was bomb damaged during World War II. Rebuilding and investment was focused on new housing estates such as Hartcliffe and Southmead rather than St Paul's, and this contributed to a decline in the quality of the area. During the large-scale immigration of the 1950s, many people moved from Jamaica and Ireland, and settled in St Paul's.

In 1963 St Paul's became the focus of attention when members of the British African-Caribbean community organised the Bristol Bus Boycott to protest against the racist employment policy of the Bristol Omnibus Company which operated a colour bar, refusing employment to non-white workers as bus crews. This policy was overturned in August of that year after sixty days of protest and the action helped establish the Race Relations Act 1968.

A riot followed a police raid on the Black and White Café in St Paul's on 2 April 1980. The St Pauls riot started when the police entered the café, knowing that the premises was being used for drug dealing. A customer had his trousers ripped and demanded compensation, which the police refused. A crowd outside then refused to allow the police to leave, and when back-up was called a riot started. The riots were quickly blamed on race, but both white and black youths from both Irish and Jamaican backgrounds and some English fought against the police and the problems are thought to have been linked instead to poverty and perceived social injustices, predominantly the Sus law and anti-Irish feelings from IRA activity on the mainland.

In 1990 a  St Paul's black politician Kuomba Balogun, Chairman of the Bristol West Labour Party, was reported in the Bristol Evening Post of 2 February, as saying: "We make a public plea to the IRA to consider ways of strongly giving some assistance to the armed wing of the ANC in the same light as Colonel Gaddaffi sought to assist in the liberation of the people of Ireland."  An Early Day Motion was presented in Parliament calling on him to be expelled from the Labour Party.

This area of the city has also suffered its share of gun violence, reaching a high point in the early 2000s (decade) when rival Jamaican Yardie and drug gangs such as the British Aggi Crew fought turf wars over territory. The drugs war between the rival feuding factions was extinguished following en masse arrests of both the Yardies and the home-grown Aggi Crew, with many of the foreign drug dealers being deported back to Jamaica.

The Black and White Café was closed in March 2005, and has been demolished to make way for houses after a compulsory purchase order. Now the area is experiencing a positive urban renewal with the St Paul's Unlimited scheme.

Community
St Paul's has a large African-Caribbean population. The relative poverty of the area has created a strong community spirit shown in the St Pauls Carnival, similar to the Notting Hill Carnival in London. It has been run annually since 1967 except for a hiatus in 2015–17, and by 2006 attracted an average of 40,000 people each year. This is a vibrant parade with local primary schools and community groups joining in.

Parks
The main parks are St Agnes Park and St Paul's Park, together with Portland and Brunswick squares. Other green spaces include Grosvenor Road Triangle and Dalrymple Road Park. A footbridge over the A4032 allows access to nearby Riverside Park, alongside the Frome.

Architecture

Many of the buildings in St Pauls are Georgian period, with Portland Square and St Paul's Church as particularly fine examples of Georgian architecture in the area. Both were designed by Daniel Hague although the original St Pauls Church was to be designed by James Allen in a Greek style. Work was started on the church in 1789 and completed in 1794. Edward William Godwin, a famous Victorian architect, lived at Portland Square. In 2005 the church was converted into its present form as the home of 'Circomedia', a circus school.

Redevelopment plans 

In May 2007 proposals were announced to build about  net of homes, offices and businesses, in the St Pauls area. The tower would be a similar shape to the Swiss Re "gherkin" tower in London.

Politics
St Pauls is part of the Ashley ward of Bristol City Council, along with St Agnes, St Andrews, Montpelier and St Werburghs. Ashley ward is represented by three elected councillors on Bristol City Council. Currently, these are Mike Davies and Carole Johnson of the Labour Party, and Jude English of the Green Party.

References

External links

 St Pauls Unlimited Project

 
Saint Pauls